Conasprella poremskii is a species of sea snail, a marine gastropod mollusc in the family Conidae, the cone snails, cone shells or cones.

Description
The size of the shell attains 13 mm.

Distribution
This species occurs in the Caribbean Sea and in the Atlantic Ocean off Brazil.

References

 Petuch E.J. & Myers R.F. (2014) New species of Conidae and Conilithidae (Gastropoda: Conoidea) from the Bahamas, eastern Caribbean, and Brazil. Xenophora Taxonomy 3: 26-46.
  Puillandre N., Duda T.F., Meyer C., Olivera B.M. & Bouchet P. (2015). One, four or 100 genera? A new classification of the cone snails. Journal of Molluscan Studies. 81: 1-23

External links
  To World Register of Marine Species
 

poremskii
Gastropods described in 2014